Niari (can also be written as Niadi) is a department of the Republic of the Congo in the western part of the country. It borders the departments of Bouenza, Kouilou, and Lékoumou, and internationally, Gabon, the Democratic Republic of the Congo, and the Cabinda portion of Angola. The regional capital is Dolisie.

Administrative divisions 
According to an administrational reorganisation of 2012, Niari Department is divided into fourteen districts and two communes not belonging to any district:

Districts 
 Louvakou District
 Kibangou District
 Divénié District
 Mayoko District
 Kimongo District
 Moutamba District
 Banda District
 Londéla–Kayes District
 Makabana District
 Mbinda District
 Moungoundou-Sud District
 Nyanga District
 Moungoundou-Nord District
 Yaya District

Communes 
 Dolisie
 Mossendjo

References

Republic of the Congo at GeoHive

 
Departments of the Republic of the Congo